Kimberly Alexis Bledel (born September 16, 1981) is an American actress and model. She is known for her role as Rory Gilmore on the television series Gilmore Girls (2000–2007), and Emily Malek in The Handmaid's Tale (2017–2021). Bledel also had a recurring role in Mad Men in 2012 and reprised her role as Rory Gilmore in the Netflix reunion miniseries Gilmore Girls: A Year in the Life (2016).

Bledel made her feature film debut as Winnie Foster in the Disney live action adaptation of Tuck Everlasting (2002), and went on to appear in Sin City (2005), Post Grad (2009), and as Lena Kaligaris in The Sisterhood of the Traveling Pants film series.

Bledel has received various awards and nominations for her work. For her role in Gilmore Girls, she received nominations for Satellite, Teen Choice and Young Artist Awards. For her role in The Handmaid's Tale she has received four Primetime Emmy Award nominations, winning Outstanding Guest Actress in a Drama Series. She has also received three Screen Actors Guild Award nominations for Outstanding Ensemble Cast in a Drama Series.

Early life and family
Bledel was born on September 16, 1981 in Houston, Texas, to Nanette (née Dozier), who worked as a gift processor and flight attendant, and Martín Bledel. She has a younger brother, Eric. Her father is Argentinian. Her mother, Nanette, was born in Phoenix, Arizona, and her family moved back to Mexico, at the age of eight. Her paternal grandfather, Enrique Einar Bledel Huus, was born in Buenos Aires, Argentina, and was of Danish and German descent; Enrique was Vice President of Coca-Cola Latin America and the Coca-Cola Inter-American Corporation. Bledel's paternal grandmother, Jean (née Campbell), was originally from New York and had Scottish, Irish and English ancestry. Of her parents' upbringing in Latin America, Bledel has stated: "It's the only culture my mom knows from life, and my father as well, and they made the decision to raise their children within the context they had been raised in." Bledel grew up in a Spanish-speaking household, and did not learn English until she began school; she identifies herself as Latina.

Bledel attended Baptist and Lutheran schools, and graduated from the Catholic St. Agnes Academy in Houston in 1999. Her mother encouraged her to try community theater to overcome her shyness. As a child, Bledel appeared in local productions of Our Town and The Wizard of Oz. She was scouted at a local shopping mall and given work as a fashion model.

Career

20002008: Debut and rise to stardom 
Bledel made her television debut in 2000 opposite Lauren Graham in The WB comedy-drama Gilmore Girls, which ran for seven seasons from October 5, 2000, to May 15, 2007. She played Rory Gilmore, the daughter of Lorelai Gilmore (Graham), a single mother. Initially, Rory was a high school student at an exclusive private academy, living with her mother in a small town in Connecticut, but later moved on to college at Yale University, where she, among other things, worked as the editor of the Yale Daily News.
Bledel made her feature film debut opposite Jonathan Jackson in the fantasy romantic drama Tuck Everlasting (2002), based on Natalie Babbitt's novel of the same name (1975). Before her work in that film, Bledel was an uncredited extra in the 1998 comedy-drama Rushmore. In 2005, she co-starred in the drama The Sisterhood of the Traveling Pants, opposite Amber Tamblyn, America Ferrera, and Blake Lively, and based on Ann Brashares' novel of the same name. She played Lena Kaligaris, an aspiring artist on a journey with her three best friends, linked over the summer by a pair of "magical" jeans.

In 2005, Bledel co-starred in the anthology neo-noir crime thriller Sin City where she played Becky, a prostitute. "She's a very professional prostitute. She carries a gun and she kicks ass," said Bledel of her character. In 2006, Bledel co-starred opposite Jay Baruchel in the romantic comedy I'm Reed Fish as the fiancée of Baruchel's title character. After the end of Gilmore Girls, she reprised her role of Lena Kaligaris in The Sisterhood of the Traveling Pants 2, released in August 2008. The following year, Bledel starred in the comedy Post Grad, which was released on August 21, 2009.

2009present: Continued recognition 
Bledel co-starred opposite Scott Porter and Bryan Greenberg in the romantic comedy The Good Guy, which premiered at Tribeca Film Festival April 26, 2009. The film centered around Porter's character Tommy, a Wall Street investment broker whose life falls apart when he helps out Greenberg's character Daniel, a new broker. Bledel played Beth, Tommy's girlfriend. In April 2009, Bledel guest-starred in the NBC medical drama ER in the two-hour series finale titled "And in the End..." as Dr. Julia Wise, a new intern to the hospital. In May 2009, Bledel signed a contract with the modeling division of IMG.

Bledel co-starred opposite James McAvoy and Robin Wright in the historical drama The Conspirator directed by Robert Redford. She played the girlfriend of McAvoy's character Frederick Aiken, the lawyer who defended Mary Surratt, the first woman to be hanged by the federal government of the United States, played by Wright. The film premiered at the Toronto International Film Festival and was released in the United States on April 15, 2011.
Also in 2010, Bledel starred as the title role in the Canadian drama The Kate Logan Affair. The film was presented at Montreal's Festival du Nouveau Cinéma 2010.

Bledel performed in the theatre production Regrets by the Manhattan Theatre Club, staged at the New York City Center.
It was confirmed in early-March 2013 that Bledel would co-star opposite Jason Ritter in the Fox pilot Friends & Family, an adaptation of the British sitcom Gavin & Stacey as Stacey with Ritter as Gavin. The pilot was picked up for a series and was retitled Us & Them. However, Fox eventually decided not to air the series, which eventually aired in the fall of 2018 on Sony Crackle. 2015 saw Bledel starring with Katherine Heigl as the fiancée to Heigl's character in the film Jenny's Wedding.

On January 29, 2016, Netflix announced a revival of Gilmore Girls with a series of four 90-minute films set around the four seasons, and Bledel's participation was confirmed. In 2017, she appeared as Ofglen, later known as Emily Malek in The Handmaid's Tale for Hulu; subsequently, her role was expanded to a regular role for the second season. Her critically acclaimed performance earned Bledel her first Emmy Award nomination and win in the 2017 Creative Arts ceremony in the category of Outstanding Guest Actress in a Drama Series. She departed after the fourth season.

Public image
Bledel has appeared on the cover of numerous fashion magazines, including Teen Vogue, Glamour, CosmoGirl, Vanity Fair, Lucky, Elle Girl, Parade, Nylon, and Seventeen. In 2000, she appeared in print advertisements for Bonne Bell lip balm and Naturistics lip gloss.

She has been included in magazine lists of the world's most beautiful women. In 2002, she was named one of Teen People "25 Hottest Stars under 25". Bledel was ranked at number 87 on Maxim magazine's "Hot 100 of 2005" list. Bledel was named one of Us Weekly "25 Most Stylish New Yorkers" in 2010.

Personal life
Bledel and fellow former Gilmore Girls co-star Milo Ventimiglia were in a relationship from December 2002 to June 2006.

In 2012, Bledel began dating Vincent Kartheiser, whose character, Pete Campbell, shared scenes with her character Beth Dawes, during her guest-starring run on Mad Men. The couple announced their engagement in March 2013 and married in California in June 2014. Bledel gave birth to their first child, a son, in the fall of 2015. On August 10, 2022, Kartheiser filed for divorce from Bledel; the divorce was finalized on August 26.

Bledel supported the 2012 re-election of Barack Obama and urged her fans to vote.

Filmography

Film

Television

Theater

Music videos
 "She's Gonna Break Soon" (2003) by Less Than Jake

Awards and recognition

 2002  Voted one of Teen Peoples "25 Hottest Stars Under 25"
 2005  Ranked No. 87 on the Maxim Hot 100 Women
 2010  Named one of Us Magazine "25 Most Stylish New Yorkers"

Notes

References

External links

 
 

1981 births
21st-century American actresses
Actresses from Houston
Female models from Texas
American film actresses
American people of Argentine descent
American people of Danish descent
American television actresses
Hispanic and Latino American actresses
Living people
Tisch School of the Arts alumni
American people of German descent
American people of Scottish descent
American people of English descent
People from Brooklyn Heights